The Town of Albany was a local government area in the Great Southern region of Western Australia representing the town of Albany,  south-southeast of the capital, Perth.

History

The Municipality of Albany was gazetted on 21 February 1871. It was initially headed by a chairman until 1885, after which the municipality had a succession of early notable mayors.

William Finlay was the first mayor of Albany when he was elected in 1885. William Grills Knight was elected in 1886 and was succeeded by Lancel Victor de Hamel in 1889. John Moir was elected after De Hamel left to enter state politics later the same year and served until 1890. Robert Andrew Muir was elected in 1891 and retired at the end of his year's term due to ill health. Moir was reelected from 1894 to 1897.

The municipality was granted town status and renamed the Town of Albany on 1 July 1961.

It amalgamated with the Shire of Albany to become the City of Albany on 1 July 1998.

References

Albany
1871 establishments in Australia

External links
Official Site